Jesse Fioranelli (born 21 November 1979) is an Italian football manager. He is a member of the technical staff of manager Stefano Pioli at Serie A club AC Milan. Prior to this role, he was the General Manager of San Jose Earthquakes in MLS.

SS Lazio
Fioranelli was hired by S.S. Lazio in 2012 as a member of the coaching staff alongside Vladimir Petkovic as match analyst.

Following the historic Coppa Italia win in 2013 against city rival Roma, Fioranelli was promoted to Head of Analysis and Scouting at the club after Vladimir Petkovic parted ways to join the Swiss National Team.

His third and last season, 2014/15, with the Roman club with Stefano Pioli as Manager of SS Lazio, the team again reached the Final of the Coppa Italia, but lost in extra-time to Juventus. The same season, SS Lazio finished 3rd and qualified for the final play-off round of the UEFA Champions League.

AS Roma
Approached by Walter Sabatini, sporting director of AS Roma, Fioranelli joined AS Roma the following season, 2015/16, with a broader managerial role as a member of the Direzione Sportiva.

In 2016, the Italian Federation, Federazione Italiana Giuoco Calcio, published Fioranelli's dissertation Why invest in Italian Football following his Sports Director accreditation.

San Jose Earthquakes
In January 2017, San Jose Earthquakes announced the hiring of Fioranelli as the team's General Manager. The club announced that they had parted ways with Fioranelli on June 29, 2021.

AC Milan
In July 2022, Fioranelli joined the technical staff of manager Stefano Pioli at Serie A club AC Milan.

References

1979 births
Living people
San Jose Earthquakes non-playing staff